The Welsh Rugby Union Division Six West (also called the SWALEC Division Six West for sponsorship reasons) is a rugby union league in Wales first implemented for the 2006/07 season.

Competition
There are 10 clubs in the WRU Division Six West. During the course of a season (which lasts from September to May) each club plays the others twice, once at their home ground and once at the home ground of their opponents for a total of 18 games for each club, with a total of 90 games in each season. Teams receive four points for a win and two point for a draw, an additional bonus point is awarded to either team if they score four tries or more in a single match. No points are awarded for a loss though the losing team can gain a bonus point for finishing the match within seven points of the winning team. Teams are ranked by total points, then the number of tries scored and then points difference. At the end of each season, the club with the most points is crowned as champion. If points are equal the tries scored then points difference determines the winner.

Sponsorship 
In 2008 the Welsh Rugby Union announced a new sponsorship deal for the club rugby leagues with SWALEC valued at £1 million (GBP). The initial three year sponsorship was extended at the end of the 2010/11 season, making SWALEC the league sponsors until 2015. The leagues sponsored are the WRU Divisions one through to seven.

 (2007-2008) No sponsor as league created during sponsorship term.
 (2008-2011) SWALEC

2010/2011 Season

League Teams
 Blaenau RFC
 Fall Bay RFC
 Llangadog RFC
 Llansawel RFC
 Mynydd y Garegg RFC
 Nantgaredig RFC
 Pantyffynnon RFC
 Penybanc RFC
 South Gower RFC
 Tregaron RFC

2009/2010 Season

League Teams
 Blaenau RFC
 Fall Bay RFC
 Llangadog RFC
 Llansawel RFC
 Mynydd y Garegg RFC
 Nantgaredig RFC
 Pantyffynnon RFC
 Penybanc RFC
 South Gower RFC
 Tregaron RFC

2008/2009 Season

League Teams
 Aberavon Naval Club RFC
 Fall Bay RFC
 Llangadog RFC
 Nantgaredig RFC
 Pantyffynnon RFC
 Penlan RFC
 Penybanc RFC
 Pontrhydyfen RFC
 South Gower RFC
 Tregaron RFC

League table

2007/2008 Season

League Teams
 Aberavon Naval Club RFC
 Cimla RFC
 Fall Bay RFC
 Llangadog RFC
 Nantgaredig RFC
 Penlan RFC
 Penybanc RFC
 Pontrhydyfen RFC
 South Gower RFC
 Tregaron RFC

League table

References

8